The 2014–15 Macedonian Second League was the 23rd season of the Macedonian Second Football League, the second  football division of Macedonia. It began on 9 August 2014 and ended on 23 May 2015.

In that season, 10 teams performs instead of 16 because the Football Federation of Macedonia in May 2013 voted for decision on the decrease of the league.

Participating teams

1 Gorno Lisiche played until 11th round on Boris Trajkovski Stadium.

2 Mladost Carev Dvor played their first 2 home games on SRC Biljanini Izvori in Ohrid, due to expanding their stadium in Resen.Also, the club was played one home match on Stadion Tumbe Kafe in Bitola.

3 Vëllazërimi participated in the first part of season as Vrapchishte.

League table

Results

Matches 1–18

Matches 19–27

Promotion playoff

First leg

Second leg

Horizont Turnovo won 3–1 on aggregate

Relegation playoff

The Relegation Playoff includes 6 clubs (the 8th placed theam from the Second League, as well as the 5 winners of the Third Leagues) which are going to be arranged in 3 pairs, playing on home-away rule. The winners of those playoffs win a spot for the next seasons Second League.

First leg

Second leg

Gorno Lisiče won 7–1 on aggregate

Ljubanci 1974 won 7–1 on aggregate

Pobeda won 5–2 on aggregate

See also
2014–15 Macedonian Football Cup
2014–15 Macedonian First Football League
2014–15 Macedonian Third Football League

References

External links
Football Federation of Macedonia 
MacedonianFootball.com 

Macedonia 2
2
Macedonian Second Football League seasons